Negrobovia is a genus of flies in the family Dolichopodidae found in Australia. It is named in honor of O.P. Negrobov.

Species
The genus contains three species:
Negrobovia aculicita Bickel, 1994
Negrobovia australensis (Schiner, 1868)
Negrobovia flavihalteralis Bickel, 1994

References 

Dolichopodidae genera
Sciapodinae
Diptera of Australasia
Insects of Australia